The American Conservation Film Festival (ACFF) is an annual film festival established in 2003 and based in Shepherdstown, West Virginia. Its stated mission is to present "conservation-focused films and programs that engage, inform, and inspire".

References

External links

Environmental film festivals in the United States
Film festivals in West Virginia
Shepherdstown, West Virginia
Film festivals established in 2003